Brookfield Center is a census-designated place (CDP) in the town of Brookfield, Fairfield County, Connecticut, United States. It includes the  Brookfield Center Historic District around the intersection of Connecticut Routes 25 and 133, as well as surrounding residential neighborhoods.

Brookfield Center was first listed as a CDP prior to the 2020 census.

References 

Census-designated places in Fairfield County, Connecticut
Census-designated places in Connecticut